Rakke Parish was a rural municipality of Estonia, in Lääne-Viru County.

Settlements
Rakke Parish had 1 small borough and 30 villages.

Small borough
Rakke

Villages

Ao - Edru - Emumäe - Jäätma - Kaavere - Kadiküla - Kamariku - Kellamäe - Kitsemetsa - Koila - Koluvere - Kõpsta - Lahu - Lammasküla - Lasinurme - Liigvalla - Mõisamaa - Mäiste - Nõmmküla - Olju - Padaküla - Piibe - Räitsvere - Salla - Sootaguse - Suure-Rakke - Tammiku - Villakvere - Väike-Rakke - Väike-Tammiku.

See also
Endla Nature Reserve

References

This article includes content from the Estonian Wikipedia article Rakke vald.

External links